Jesper Ylivainio (born February 7, 1997) is a Swedish professional ice hockey player. He is currently playing with Piteå HC of the HockeyEttan (Div.1).

On February 27, 2015, Ylivainio made his Swedish Hockey League debut playing with Luleå HF during the 2014–15 SHL season.

References

External links

1997 births
Living people
Asplöven HC players
Luleå HF players
Mora IK players
Piteå HC players
Swedish ice hockey forwards
Tingsryds AIF players
IF Troja/Ljungby players